Niluka Ekanayake is a Sri Lankan politician and astrologer. She was appointed by President Maithripala Sirisena from 17 March 2016 to  11 April 2018 as the 10th Governor of Central Province. She was also appointed as the 9th Governor of Sabaragamuwa Province, Sri Lanka from 12 April 2018 to 31 December 2018. In January 2019 she was appointed as the Chairman of the State Timber Corporation (STC).

She is the first LGBTQ+ person and the first transgender woman to hold the office of Governor in a Sri Lankan Province, and is considered to be the first openly transgender head of a government in the world.

See also
 List of openly LGBT heads of government
 List of transgender political office-holders

References

Governors of Central Province, Sri Lanka
Sinhalese politicians
Sri Lankan Buddhists
Transgender politicians
Transgender women
Sri Lankan LGBT politicians
LGBT governors and heads of sub-national entities
Sri Lankan astrologers
20th-century astrologers
21st-century astrologers
Women provincial governors of Sri Lanka
21st-century Sri Lankan politicians
21st-century Sri Lankan women politicians
Year of birth missing (living people)
Living people